İstisu (known as Kirovsk and Kirov until 1999) is a village and municipality in the Lankaran Rayon of Azerbaijan. It has a population of 3,038.

References

Populated places in Lankaran District